The Isulan bombing was an act of Islamic terrorism by Bangsamoro Islamic Freedom Fighters in the municipality of Isulan, Sultan Kudarat, killing 3 and injuring over 36 in a town festival.

August 28 bombing
The bombing occurred on August 28, 2018 at around 8:34 pm (UTC+8) in Barangay Kalawag 3 in front of J and H Marketing, a retail area for ukay ukay merchandise, along the National Highway around the area of the Isulan town proper. The explosion was caused by an improvised explosive device planted on a parked motorcycle. The incident happened amidst the Hamungaya Festival, a harvest festival celebrated in the Isulan annually.

Casualties
The blasts had three casualties; a 51-year-old, a 7-year-old child, and a 18-year-old college student. The 51-year-old died at the bombing site while the two died while confined in a hospital due to serious injuries from shrapnel wounds. 36 people were injured which includes two soldiers and a militia personnel.

Investigation

Suspects
The police and military suspects that the Bangsamoro Islamic Freedom Fighters are behind the bombing. The group is known for attacking civilian targets in retaliation to the group's losses in clashes against the Philippine Army's 6th Infantry Division. The Police Regional Office-12 (PRO-12) of the Philippine National Police (PNP) is determining the identity of two couriers who are said to have planted the bomb.

The PNP PRO-12 later released an official sketch of an individual tagged as a suspect to the bombing. The image was released to various media firms on September 1, 2018. The police believes that the suspect is working with accomplices since the bombing was made in a manner that it can't be done by a single person. A day after a bombing, an unofficial computer-generated cartographic sketch of the suspect began circulating in social media. The police views this as a possible attempt to muddle the investigation.

Authorities filed charges against 7 suspects, 2 of which are still at large.  Four had been identified as Normia Antao Camsa, Norshiya Joven Camsa, Abedin Camsa alias “Beds,” and the Swedish national, Hassan Akgun.

Methods
According to the police, the suspect detonated an improvised explosive device (IED) using a mobile phone. He is said to have been accosted by a militiaman when he placed the bomb under a parked motorbike. The IED's composition is determined to consists of black powder filled inside a barrel of water pump laced with cut nails and metal shards. A nine-volt battery was placed as a triggering device.

Reaction
Executive Salvador Medialdea hinted on August 29 that the Martial law in Mindanao which is due to terminate by the end of 2018 could be extended following the bombing. Local officials of Sultan Kudarat as well as Maguindanao expressed openness to the possible extension of martial law which they assess could help maintain peace and order in the island. Further activities in relation to the 104th foundation day of Isulan and the Hamungaya Festival were cancelled.

September 2 twin bombings
A second explosion occurred on September 2, outside an Internet café, where 2 died and 12 are injured.

See also
 2019 Isulan bombings

References

2018 murders in the Philippines
August 2018 crimes in Asia
August 2018 events in the Philippines
History of Sultan Kudarat
Mass murder in 2018
Mass murder in Asia
September 2018 crimes in Asia
September 2018 events in the Philippines
Terrorist incidents in Asia in 2018
Terrorist incidents in the Philippines in 2018